Shuizhai High School (Chinese: 水寨中学) is a Chinese high school established in 1914.

School profile 

Shuizhai High School is located in Wuhua County, Meizhou, Guangdong Province, China, covering 84,000 square meters. There are 90 classes of 6,000 students with 400 staff that include 300 full-time teachers. 
The school is known to have  five major departments: Liberal Arts, Science, Music, Fine Art and Physical Education. It is one of the ten key high schools in Meizhou, and is said to have a time-honoured football team. Shuizhai high school celebrated its centennial on 15 November 2014.

History of Shuizhai High School 

Shuizhai High School (Chinese: 水寨中学) was established in 1914. It was once a private primary school named Zhenxing Primary School and became Zhenxing High School in 1950. In the winter of 1950, approved by the Wuhua County government, the private Zhenxing High School turned into the public Shuizhai High School. In 1974, the school was renamed Wuhua High School and resumed the name of Shuizhai High School in 1981. It was assessed as a city-level high school in 1996, and eliminated the junior high school in 1999. It was assessed as a province-level high school of Guangdong province in 2000. The school’s teaching quality has been assessed by the Guangdong Ministry of Education of the High School Teaching Level Evaluation and won the title of “Outstanding High School” in 2008. It also has been identified as a national model high school.

School facilities

The buildings in Shuizhai High School cover an area of 50,000 square meters, including classrooms, laboratory buildings, library, gymnasium, teachers’ office building, and faculty and student dormitory buildings. The architectural style varies. In the middle of these buildings is the standard sport ground of 400 meters plastic racetrack. The school enjoys a name of “The Beautiful School of Meizhou City” for its peaceful school environment and green plants around the school roads.
The school has good teaching facilities and modern equipment such as the 1000M internet backbone, multimedia teaching platform, and electronic reading room. The living facilities of the school are well-equipped; every student dormitory building has a hot water supply system that assures every student can use it; each room has been equipped with two fans; and the school's cafeterias have been standardized and now are arranged under the standard management, which guarantees the dietary safety of students. In addition, junior students' dormitories have equipped with air-conditioning and washing machines.

School Staff 

In recent years, the school has cultivated a large number of distinguished teachers, including 400 faculty members and more than 300 full-time teachers. Among these full-time teachers, 90% have bachelor's degrees, two have National Excellent Teachers Certificates, two are outstanding national training teachers, five are developing teachers for "National Talents Project", and fifty have Senior Teacher Certificates. With the support of Chinese American Zhang Cile, Shuizhai High School cooperates with Truman State University of America to hold the cultural communication activities. In order to improve the quality of English classes, the school has hired three foreign teachers. In recent years, the school has further defined its mission, which is "face to all, good to all". The school is also dedicated to "constructing an excellent and famous nation model high school".

According to the standards of national model high schools and the current low numbers of "Excellent Students", Shuizhai High School is taking actions to improve the quality of education in five ways: (1). Inviting famous teachers to give lectures, (2). Selecting 50 staff every year to visit and learn from some famous schools either inside or outside the province, (3) Increasing training efforts on School's staff, developing an excellent teaching group, (4). Implementing the complete class teaching reform. Since 2012, the school has practiced the teaching reform in grade one under the mode of "Four in One Teaching". The school's teaching reform has been approved by the Meizhou Education Bureau and other high schools in Meizhou, which expand the influence of Shuizhai High School. (5). Beginning in 2013, the school has worked to enlist the junior students and recruit 200 good students every year in Wuhua City in order to cultivate a certain number of "Top Students". After several years' effort, the teaching quality of the school has improved; the rates of admission to universities have increased; the number of students that admitted to key universities has risen and new top students are constantly emerging.

Educational mission 

The school operates on the principles of teaching for the education of people, for the power and wealth of the country. Shuizhai High School strives to form a "Democratic, United, Diligent, Active" school spirit, a "love, diligent, modest, pragmatic" teaching style, a "discerning, diligent, intensive, applied" learning style.

School achievements 

More than twenty students of Shuizhai High School attended Qinghua University, Peking University. In the college entrance examination of 2009, Li Yuanxin was admitted to Peking University with a high score. The school has trained five good athletes for the national football team. In 1959, Shuizhai High School ranked 5th in the college entrance exam and was acclaimed as "a Red Flag in the Valley Area" by Shantou Diary. In 1990, the school performed "Luohua Dance"  (锣花舞) in the Guangdong Art Festival.

Many alumni have become specialists, scholars, generals, entrepreneurs, and senior government officials. The school was awarded "Prominent General Education Group of Guangdong Province" twice, in 1982 and 1985. In 2008, it was named as "National Model High School".
Since its construction, Shuizhai High School has cultivated a large number of talents for society and obtained a significant achievement in running a school. Outstanding alumni include some important officials in government and army, such as Guangdong Province's vice-governor Wan Qingliang, Guangdong Military Region Deputy Commander Chen Tianlin, and Chinese People's Liberation Army Air Force's disciplinary committee member Ma Wen, as well as a large number of scientific researchers such as Li Yaohui, Zeng Yuanhua, Zhong Suisheng, and Zou Shengwei.

School activities 

The school holds sport meetings and art performance every year. The literary magazine is Chun Sun, which has enriched students' after-school life and morally, intellectually and physically promoted their development.

School Management 

In recent years, School has further defined the school mission of "Face to All, All to be Good" and proposed its objective for building up a city class and famous national model high school. For this objective, the school has started the project of "Stressing Two Features, Strengthening Three Intensities" since from 2002. The first feature is the character of moral education. With the further perfection of moral education network, the school has actively enhanced the educational research on "Strengthening the Research of Teenagers' Psychological Health"; it has provided teachers for mental health education and activities for psychological consultation. The school has applied for Guangdong Province's model school in mental health education. The second feature is the character of audio-visual education, which aims to play the schoolyard net and multimedia teaching platform and comprehensively apply the multimedia assisted teaching.

In the "Strengthening Three Intensities" project, the first is strengthening the intensity in management; the school has constantly improved the scientific, principled, institutional and people-oriented management mechanism, and intended to achieve the computer network management. The second measure is strengthening the training for the school staff. The school takes the measure of "Going Outside and Inviting Inside", which means School will invite experts and professions to give lectures in School and hire foreign teachers (there are four foreign teachers in School now). The school will also organize the teachers to learn from famous schools and train more excellent teachers. The third one is strengthening School's teaching research and scientific research. School requires one project for every teacher in each semester and conducts subject report courses in each semester.

Donations

The construction and development of the school have always been  supported by alumni and people from all circles. In 1986, the Hong Kong Christians Council donated an experimental building. In 1987, an alumnus of Hong Kong, Mr. Zhou Yaojing donated a Fulin Library. In 1994, another alumnus of Hong Kong donated and built a FuLin Building, which also as an office building. In 1996, six alumni including Mr. Zhu jianhua, Mr. Zhu Jianzhong donated a new gate. In 1996, alumnus Mr. Li Yaohua donated a YaoWen building. In November 2004, alumni donated 2.2 million RMB to build the "Ninety Years Memorial Building". In 2005, Wuhua Hometown Association in Hong Kong donated a student dormitory building. With a rough recording, donations from alumni and society has reached 6 million RMB. In December 2014, people donated 14 million RMB in Shuizhai High School's 100th anniversary to set up Zhengxing Educational Fund and build a "Centenary Building".

Enrollment plan and award setting 

According to the document spirit of secondary school recruitment in Meizhou City, Guangdong Province, the school enlisted 1800 students in 2010, which includes 1440 officially enrolled students and 360 non-registered students. All junior high school graduates of the year 2011 could apply for the School, which would choose from the candidates that put the school in the first and second batches of volunteers. But the students that wrote in the second batch should have higher scores, and non-register students should be chosen from the candidates in the first batch with higher scores. The school has set up an excellent award for the students with high entrance scores and educational grants for poor students. In 2010, the top 30 students with the first batch to volunteer for Shuizhai High School could get an award of 2000 yuan, and the students with scores that higher than the entry score of Dong Shan High School could get extra 2000 yuan. Hong Kong 's charity organizations such as "Le Shan Hao Shi" have long-term financed for poor students of School.

References 

High schools in Guangdong
Educational institutions established in 1914
1914 establishments in China